The 1980 College Football All-America team is composed of college football players who were selected as All-Americans by various organizations that chose College Football All-America Teams in 1980.

The NCAA recognizes four selectors as "official" for the 1980 season.  They are (1) the American Football Coaches Association (AFCA), (2) the Associated Press (AP), (3) the Football Writers Association of America (FWAA), and (4) the United Press International (UPI). The AP, UPI, and FWAA teams were selected by polling of sports writers and/or broadcasters. The AFCA team was based on a poll of coaches.  Other notable selectors, though not recognized by the NCAA as official, included Football News, a national weekly football publication, the Newspaper Enterprise Association (NEA), The Sporting News (TSN), and the Walter Camp Football Foundation (WC).

Fourteen players were unanimous picks by all four official selectors.  Seven of the unanimous picks were offensive players: (1) South Carolina running back and 1980 Heisman Trophy winner, George Rogers; (2) Georgia running back and 1982 Heisman Trophy winner, Herschel Walker; (3) Purdue quarterback and 1980 Sammy Baugh Trophy winner, Mark Herrmann; (4) Stanford wide receiver Ken Margerum; (5) Purdue tight end Dave Young; (6) Pittsburgh tackle Mark May; and (7) Notre Dame center John Scully.  The seven unanimous picks on the defensive side were: (1) Pittsburgh defensive end Hugh Green, who won the 1980 Walter Camp Award, Maxwell Award, Lombardi Award, and Sporting News and UPI College Football Player of the Year awards; (2) Alabama defensive end E.J. Junior; (3) Houston defensive tackle Leonard Mitchell; (4) Baylor linebacker Mike Singletary; (5) North Carolina linebacker Lawrence Taylor; (6) UCLA defensive back Kenny Easley; and (7) USC defensive back Ronnie Lott.

In 1989, The New York Times published a follow-up on the 1980 AP All-America team.  The article reported that 20 of the 22 first-team players went on to play in the NFL, with 13 still active and eight having received All-Pro honors.

Offensive selections

Wide receivers 

 Ken Margerum, Stanford (College Football Hall of Fame) (AFCA, AP-1, FWAA, UPI-1, NEA-1, WC)
 Anthony Carter, Michigan (College Football Hall of Fame) (AP-1, NEA-2, TSN)
 Cris Collinsworth, Florida (AP-2, UPI-2, NEA-1)
 Mardye McDole, Mississippi State  (NEA-2, TSN)
 David Verser, Kansas (AP-2)
 Bobby Stewart, Texas Christian (AP-3)

Tight ends 

 Dave Young, Purdue (AFCA, AP-1, FWAA, UPI-1, TSN, WC)
 Marvin Harvey, Southern Mississippi (NEA-1)
 Clay Brown, Brigham Young (AP-3, UPI-2)
 Benjie Pryor, Pitt (AP-2)
 Rodney Holman, Tulane (NEA-2)

Tackles 

 Mark May, Pittsburgh (College Football Hall of Fame) (AFCA, AP-1, FWAA, UPI-1, NEA-2 [guard], TSN, WC)
 Keith Van Horne, USC (AP-1, FWAA, UPI-1, NEA-1, TSN)
 Nick Eyre, BYU (AFCA, AP-3, FWAA, UPI-2 [guard], NEA-1)
 Bill Dugan, Penn St. (AFCA, AP-3)
 Ken Lanier, Florida State (AP-2)
 Curt Marsh, Washington (NEA-2)

Guards 

 Randy Schleusener, Nebraska (AP-1, UPI-1, NEA-1, WC)
 Louis Oubre, Oklahoma (AFCA, AP-2 [tackle], FWAA, UPI-2 [tackle], NEA-2 [tackle], WC)
 Ron Wooten, North Carolina (AP-3, UPI-2, NEA-1, WC)
 Roy Foster, USC (UPI-1, NEA-2)
 Frank Ditta, Baylor (AP-1)
 Billy Ard, Wake Forest (TSN)
 Terry Crouch, Oklahoma (TSN)
 Sean Farrell, Penn State (AP-2)
 Joe Lukens, Ohio State (AP-2)
 Howard Richards, Missouri (UPI-2)
 Frank McCallister, Navy (AP-3)

Centers 

 John Scully, Notre Dame  (AFCA, AP-1, FWAA, UPI-1, NEA-1, TSN)
 George Lilja, Michigan (AP-3, UPI-2, NEA-2, WC)
 Rick Donnalley, North Carolina (AP-2)

Quarterbacks 

 Mark Herrmann, Purdue (College Football Hall of Fame)  (AFCA [tie], AP-1, FWAA, UPI-1, WC)
 Jim McMahon, BYU (College Football Hall of Fame) (AFCA [tie], AP-2, UPI-2)
 Art Schlichter, Ohio State (NEA-1)
 John Elway, Stanford (College Football Hall of Fame) (AP-3, NEA-2, TSN)

Running backs 

 George Rogers, South Carolina (College Football Hall of Fame) (AFCA, AP-1, FWAA, UPI-1, NEA-1, TSN, WC)
 Herschel Walker, Georgia (College Football Hall of Fame) (AFCA, AP-1, FWAA, UPI-1, NEA-1, TSN, WC)
 Jarvis Redwine, Nebraska  (AFCA, UPI-1, WC)
 Freeman McNeil, UCLA (AP-2, FWAA, UPI-2, NEA-2)
 James Brooks, Auburn (AP-2, NEA-2)
 Walter Abercrombie, Baylor (AP-3)
 Marcus Allen, USC (College and Pro Football Halls of Fame) (AP-3, UPI-2)
 Dwayne Crutchfield, Iowa State (UPI-2)
 Stump Mitchell, The Citadel (AP-3)

Defensive selections

Defensive ends 

 Hugh Green, Pittsburgh (College Football Hall of Fame) (AFCA, AP-1, FWAA, UPI-1, NEA-1, TSN, WC)
 E.J. Junior, Alabama (AFCA, AP-1 [linebacker], FWAA, UPI-1, NEA-1, TSN, WC)
 Scott Zettek, Notre Dame (AP-1)
 Derrie Nelson, Nebraska (AP-2, FWAA, UPI-2, NEA-2)
 Don Blackmon, Tulsa (AP-2)
 Lyman White, LSU (NEA-2)
 Rich Dixon, California (AP-3)
 Rickey Jackson, Pittsburgh (AP-3, UPI-2)

Defensive tackles 

 Leonard Mitchell, Houston (AFCA, AP-1, UPI-1, NEA-1, TSN, WC)
 Kenneth Sims, Texas (AP-1, FWAA, UPI-1, NEA-1, TSN)
 Hosea Taylor, Houston (FWAA, WC)
 Vince Goldsmith, Oregon (AP-2, UPI-2, NEA-2)
 Mike Trgovac, Michigan (AP-2)
 John Harty, Iowa (UPI-2, NEA-2)
 Calvin Clark, Purdue (AP-3)
 Elvin Keller, West Texas State (AP-3)

Middle guards 

 Ron Simmons, Florida State (College Football Hall of Fame) (AFCA, UPI-1, WC)
 Jim Burt, Miami (Fla.) (NEA-1)
 Stan Gardner, Kansas (UPI-2)
 Hosea Taylor, Houston (NEA-2)

Linebackers 

 Mike Singletary, Baylor (College and Pro Football Halls of Fame) (AFCA, AP-1, FWAA, UPI-1, NEA-1, TSN, WC)
 Lawrence Taylor, North Carolina (Pro Football Hall of Fame)  (AFCA, AP-1, FWAA, UPI-1, NEA-2, TSN)
 Bob Crable, Notre Dame (AFCA, AP-2, UPI-1, NEA-1, TSN, WC)
 David Little, Florida (AP-1, FWAA, UPI-2, FN, NEA-2)
 Tom Boyd, Alabama (AP-3, UPI-2, WC)
 Marcus Marek, Ohio State (AP-3, UPI-2)
 Andy Cannavino, Michigan (AP-2)
 Reggie Herring, Florida State (AP-2)
 Ricky Young, Oklahoma State (AP-2)
 Chip Banks, USC (AP-3)

Defensive backs 

 Kenny Easley, UCLA (College and Pro Football Hall of Fame) (AFCA, AP-1, FWAA, UPI-1, NEA-1, TSN, WC)
 Ronnie Lott, USC (College and Pro Football Halls of Fame) (AFCA, AP-1, FWAA, UPI-1, NEA-1, TSN, WC)
 John Simmons, SMU (AFCA, AP-1, FWAA, UPI-2)
 Scott Woerner, Georgia (AFCA, AP-2, UPI-1, NEA-2, WC)
 Bobby Butler, Florida State (AP-3, NEA-1)
 Bill Whitaker, Missouri (NEA-1)
 Ted Watts, Texas Tech (NEA-2, TSN)
 Hanford Dixon, Southern Mississippi (TSN)
 Tim Wilbur, Indiana (AP-2)
 Tommy Wilcox, Alabama (AP-2)
 Todd Bell, Ohio State (UPI-2, NEA-2)
 Jeff Hipp, Georgia (UPI-2)
 Jeff Griffin, Utah (NEA-2)
 Vann McElroy, Baylor (AP-3)
 Dennis Smith, USC (AP-3)

Special teams

Kickers 

 Rex Robinson, Georgia (FWAA, UPI-1, NEA-1, WC)
 Bill Capece, Florida State (UPI-2, TSN)
 Obed Ariri, Clemson (NEA-2)

Punters 

 Rohn Stark, Florida State (FWAA, UPI-1, NEA-2, TSN)
 Ray Stachowicz, Michigan State (UPI-2, NEA-1, WC)

Key 
 Bold – Consensus All-American
 -1 – First-team selection
 -2 – Second-team selection
 -3 – Third-team selection

Official selectors
 AFCA = American Football Coaches Association
 AP = Associated Press
 FWAA = Football Writers Association of America
 UPI = United Press International

Unofficial selectors
 FN = Football News
 NEA = Newspaper Enterprise Association
 TSN = The Sporting News
 WC = Walter Camp Football Foundation

See also
 1980 All-Big Eight Conference football team
 1980 All-Big Ten Conference football team
 1980 All-Pacific-10 Conference football team
 1980 All-SEC football team

References

All-America Team
College Football All-America Teams